Edmondo Rabanser (3 November 1936 – 25 May 2016) was an Italian ice hockey player. He competed in the men's tournament at the 1964 Winter Olympics.

References

External links
 

1936 births
2016 deaths
Italian ice hockey players
Olympic ice hockey players of Italy
Ice hockey players at the 1964 Winter Olympics
People from Urtijëi
Sportspeople from Südtirol